Martyrdom is a fundamental institution of Sikhism. Sikh festivals are largely focused on the lives of the Sikh gurus and Sikh martyrs. Their martyrdoms are regarded as instructional ideals for Sikhs, and have greatly influenced Sikh culture and practices. Qazi Rukundin is generally regarded as the first Sikh martyr.

The term shahidi has been used by Sikhs since the 19th century to describe the act of martyrdom. A martyr is called a shahid (Punjabi: ਸ਼ਹੀਦ).

Martyrdom

Martyrdom is a fundamental institution of the Sikh faith. When one calls an individual a shahid, this connotes more than its definition in Arabic vocabulary or Islamic faith, which is death in battle with the infidels. For the Sikh, the perfect martyr or shahid is one who died not just in battle but also one who suffered death by refusing to renounce his faith, tenets and principles. The Sikh experience through the years gave rise to this type of ideal martyrdom.

Qazi Rukunudin (alternatively spelt as Qazi Ruknuddin) was the first Sikh martyr  at the time of Guru Nanak. Qazi Rukunudin  became a Sikh   ,when Guru Nanak visited Arabia during his fourth Udasi. Later, Amir-e-Makkah asked him to leave Sikhism but Qazi refused to disown his faith, then 7 orders  were issued against him mentioning different types of tortures and method of killing him. Qazi Rukunudin was martyred around 1510-11.

Bhai Taru Popat was the second Sikh martyr at the time of Guru Nanak Dev (1469-1539). Bhai spoke against Babur, the Mughal emperor and he was set on fire by soldiers of Babur. Bhai Taru Popat was Martyred in the year 1526. The martyrdom of Guru Arjan in the 17th century is regarded as a key moment in Sikh tradition which has influenced Sikh practices and beliefs, helping define a deliberately-separate and militant Sikh community.

The later martyrdom of Guru Tegh Bahadur, who refused to convert to Islam in an effort to protect Hindu religious practice, is credited with making respect for freedom of conscience a key part of Sikh identity. The emperor tried to convert Guru Teg Bahadur to Islam hoping that it would be easier to convert his followers if he relented. The guru was executed because he refused. Experts stated that these events galvanized the concept of Sikh martyrdom in the sense that Guru Arjan's death brought the Sikh Panth together while Guru Teg Bahadur's execution finally gave Sikh martyrdom its identity. Guru Teg Bahadur's death provided the impetus for his son, the tenth Guru Gobind Singh, to impose an outward form of Sikh identity as well as pride in his father's martyrdom. To avoid fear and demoralization, he instituted a new Sikh order called Khalsa, founded on discipline and loyalty, and martyrdom became one of its foundations. Succeeding Gurus built on this new orientation, establishing a strong, self-governing warrior group.

Prominent Sikh martyrs

 Panj Pyare,
 Guru Arjan Dev, the 5th leader of Sikhism.
 Guru Teg Bahadur, the 9th guru of Sikhism.
 Bhai Dayala is one of the Sikhs who was martyred at Chandni Chowk at Delhi in November 1675 on account of his refusal to accept Islam.
 Bhai Mati Das is one of the greatest martyrs in Sikh history, martyred at Chandni Chowk at Delhi in November 1675 to save Kashmiri Hindus.
 Bhai Sati Das is one of the greatest martyrs in Sikh history, martyred along with Guru Teg Bahadur at Chandni Chowk at Delhi in November 1675 to save Kashmiri Hindus.
 Sahibzada Ajit Singh, the eldest of Guru Gobind Singh's four sons.
 Sahibzada Jujhar Singh, the second son of Guru Gobind Singh.
 Sahibzada Zorawar Singh was the third of Guru Gobind Singh's four sons.
 Sahibzada Fateh Singh was the youngest of Guru Gobind Singh's four sons.
 Moti Ram Mehra
  Chali Mukte
 Banda Singh Bahadur was the Sikh Military Commander Appointed By Guru Gobind Singh.
 Baba Deep Singh was avenging the desecration of the Golden Temple by the Afghan army. In 1757, he led an army to defend the Golden Temple.
 Bhai Mani Singh
 Bhai Mahi Singh
 Bhai Taru Singh
 Baba Gurbaksh Singh
 Bhai Garja Singh
 Bhai Bota Singh
 Bhai Subegh Singh
 Bhai Gurbaj Singh
 Akali Phoola Singh
 Hari Singh Nalwa
 Jarnail Singh Bhindranwale was declared a martyr by the Akal Takht.
 Harjinder Singh Jinda was declared a national martyr by the Akal Takht.
 Sukhdev Singh Sukha was declared a national martyr by the Akal Takht.
 Satwant Singh assassin of Prime Minister Indira Gandhi was declared a martyr by the Akal Takht.
 Beant Singh assassin of Prime Minister Indira Gandhi was declared a martyr by the Akal Takht.

 And many more who died in Wadda ghallughara and Chotta gallughara.

See also

 Joti Jot
 Shaheed Shrine
 Kharku

Reference 

Sikh martyrs
https://en.wikipedia.org/wiki/Moti_Ram_Mehra